Julius Agwu (born April 7, 1973) is a Nigerian stand-up comedian, actor, singer and MC. Julius Agwu is the MD/CEO of Reellaif Limited, music, and movie production company. He is also an entertainment consultant and motivational speaker. He is the producer behind comedy shows like Crack Ya Ribs, Laff 4 Christ's Sake and Festival of Love.

Early life and career 
Born in Port-Harcourt, Rivers State south of Nigeria to Chief Augustine Amadi Agwu and Mrs Mary Agwu. He is the fifth child in a family of six children. He started his acting career on stage in the city of Port-Harcourt where he grew up. He acted in several television series and movies such as Torn (2013), A Long Night (2014) and After Count (2011).

Education 
Julius Agwu started his education at Elementary State School and later UBE Primary School both in Choba, Port Harcourt, Rivers State where he obtained his First School Leaving Certificate. After his primary school education he proceeded to Government Secondary School in Borokiri, Port-Harcourt, Rivers State, Nigeria and later completed his secondary school education in Akpor Grammar School in Ozoba, Port Harcourt, Rivers State obtaining his West African Senior School Certificate in the process.

While he was in Akpor Grammar School in Ozoba, he was the Social Prefect and President of the Dramatic, Debating and Cultural Society. Upon the completion of his secondary school education, he later studied Theater Arts at Diploma level from the University of Port Harcourt with specialization in acting and followed suit with a degree programme (BA) in directing in the same institution.

References

Living people
1973 births
Nigerian male comedians
21st-century Nigerian male actors
21st-century Nigerian singers
21st-century comedians
21st-century Nigerian male singers
Nigerian stand-up comedians
Nigerian male film actors
Nigerian male television actors
Male actors from Port Harcourt
Nigerian chief executives
Nigerian film producers
Nigerian male singers
University of Port Harcourt alumni
Nigerian media personalities